TIAF may refer to:

 Toronto International Art Fair
 Tokyo International Anime Fair
 The Interfaith Alliance Foundation
 The Interfaith Alliance of Florida